Arthur Reeve may refer to:

 Arthur B. Reeve (1880–1936), American mystery writer
 Arthur W. V. Reeve (1912–2002), author and scout leader from New Zealand
 Arthur Stretton Reeve (1907–1981), Bishop of Lichfield